Mahua Waterfall is a plunge type waterfall located in Patau Village, Tambunan District of Sabah, Malaysia within the Crocker Range National Park administered by Sabah Parks under the state Ministry of Tourism, Culture and Environment.

Tourism 
Mahua Waterfall is one of Sabah's nature attractions which has been opened to the public since 2003 and become tourist destination for both local and foreign visitors. In 2006, the waterfall received 5,022 visitors which later increased to 14,000 in 2013.

References 

Landforms of Sabah
Tambunan District
Tourist attractions in Sabah
Waterfalls of Malaysia